The 2012–13 Oman Elite League (known as the Omantel Elite League for sponsorship reasons) was the 37th edition of the top football league in Oman. It began on 4 October 2012 and was scheduled to finish on 19 May 2013, but for the second season running, the league title had to be decided by a playoff. Fanja SC were the defending champions, having won the previous 2011–12 Elite League season. On Wednesday, 22 May 2013, Al-Suwaiq Club won the Championship Final match against Fanja 3–1 and emerged as the champions of the 2012–13 Oman Elite League.

Teams
This season the league had increased from 12 to 14 teams. As a result, despite losing the relegation play-off to Al-Seeb Club, Salalah SC retained their place in the top division and Al-Musannah SC, whose 11th-place finish would have seen them relegated also retained their place in the top division. Ahli Sidab Club, however were relegated to the Second Division League. Saham SC and Al-Nasr S.C.S.C. were promoted to the Omani League (First Division) after finishing in the top two positions in the Second Division League in the 2011–12 season.

The winner qualified for the AFC Champions League qualifiers and the runner-up and the second runner-up qualified for the 2014 AFC Cup.

Stadia and locations

*Al-Hilal Salalah renamed Salalah in the close season

League table

Results

Championship play-off

Promotion/relegation play-off

1st leg

2nd leg

Sohar secured promotion after winning on the away goals rule

Season statistics

Top scorers

Media coverage

See also
2012–13 Sultan Qaboos Cup
2012–13 Oman Federation Cup
2012–13 Oman First Division League

References

Top level Omani football league seasons
1
Oman